"I Stand Alone" is a song by Japanese singer and actress Takako Matsu, featured on her debut album Sora no Kagami (1997). It was released as the second single from the album in May 1997. The lyrics of the song were penned by Matsu and production handled by Daisuke Hinata. The single peaked at number 7 on the Oricon Singles Chart and was certified Gold by the Recording Industry Association of Japan (RIAJ).

Track listing

Charts

References

External links
I Stand Alone on Sony Music Japan website
 

1997 songs
1997 singles
Japanese-language songs
Takako Matsu songs
BMG Japan singles